is a Japanese professional shogi player ranked 7-dan.

Early life
Issei Takazaki was born in Nichinan, Miyazaki on February 12, 1987. At the beginning of his shogi apprenticeship, Takazaki commuted from his hometown to the Japan Shogi Association's headquarters in Tokyo alone by plane to participate in the regularly scheduled meetings and games, but also stayed at Yonenaga's home as a live-in apprentice for a period of time.

Takazaki was promoted to 1-dan in April 2000 and then to 3-dan in 2002. He obtained full professional status and corresponding rank of 4-dan in October 2005 after finishing tied for first in the 37th 3-dan league with a record of 13 wins and 5 losses,  thus becoming the first person from Miyazaki Prefecture to become a professional shogi player.

Promotion history
Takazaki's promotion history is as follows:
 6-kyū: 1998
 1-dan: 2000
 4-dan: October 1, 2005
 5-dan: February 2, 2010
 6-dan: May 15, 2012
 7-dan: September 18, 2020

References

External links
ShogiHub: Professional Player Info · Takasaki, Issei

Japanese shogi players
Living people
Professional shogi players
Professional shogi players from Miyazaki Prefecture
1987 births